King of Shadows is a children's historical novel by Susan Cooper published in 1999 by Penguin In the United Kingdom, it was a finalist for both the Carnegie Medal and the Guardian Children's Fiction Prize.

Plot
Nathan 'Nat' Field is a young boy from Greenville, North Carolina. He was recruited by Arby, a diligent play producer (who can come off rude), to join the Company of boys. They intend  on reenacting A Midsummer's Night's Dream and Julius Caesar in London, at the re-built Globe theatre, just as they had done in Shakespeare's time. He is chosen to be Puck in a Midsummer Night's Dream and Pindarus in Julius Caesar. As he was going to their first rehearsal he feels odd and can smell some foul stench. He returns to the house in which he was staying with a family and he feels ill and goes to bed early. He wakes up in a different room with a boy he doesn't recognise talking to him in a heavy Elizabethan accent. He says he thought he had the plague and is relieved to see him better. He realises he travelled back 400 years in time, to the year 1599, when the Globe Theatre was first built. He meets William Shakespeare and acts with him in the play he had rehearsed for in his own time, and experiences theater as it was originally intended. Before he knows it, he is back in the hospital bed, awake and unsure whether what he experienced was real. Later, Rachel Levin and Gil Warmun, his co-actors from the present time, try to find out who he was 400 years ago.

Synopsis

Nathan Field, a talented young actor, arrives at the newly rebuilt Globe theatre in London to play Puck in A 'Midsummer's Night's dream. As rehearsals begin, eerie echoes of the past begin to haunt Nat and he falls ill with a mysterious sickness. 
When he wakes, Nat finds himself in 1599, an actor at the original Globe - and his co-star is none other than the King of Shadows himself: William Shakespeare.
Nat's new life is full of excitement, danger, and the passionate friendship that he has longed for since the tragic death of his parents. But why has he been sent to the past - and is he trapped there forever?

Characters
Nathan 'Nat' Field, the main character of the story.
1999
Arby, 
Gil Warmun,
Rachel Levin,
Mr. Fisher, 
Aunt Jen,
Pudding Face, 
Eric,
Ferdie,
David Roper,
Ray Danza,
Joe Wilson,
Alan Wong.
1599
Richard Burbage,
William Shakespeare,
Roper, 
Queen Elizabeth I,
Will Kempe,
Richard Mulcaster,
Harry,
Sam and Henry Condell

Characters as characters in the play
1999
Nat Field as Puck.

Gil Warmun as Oberon.

David Roper (Roper) as Bottom.

Ray Danza as Theseus.

Joe Wilson as Hippolyta.

Alan Wong as Titania.

Eric as Mustard-Seed.

Adaptations
King of Shadows was adapted for the stage in 2005 and first performed by the New York State Theatre Institute (NYSTI) starring P. J. Verhoest as Nat, David Bunce as Shakespeare, John Romeo as Burbage, and Aaron Marquise as Roper.

See also
 
 Shakespearean English
 Time travel in fiction

References

External links
  —immediately, first UK edition 
 

Novels by Susan Cooper
British children's novels
Children's historical novels
Novels about time travel
Novels set in Tudor England
Novels set in London
Novels about actors
2005 plays
1999 British novels
1999 children's books
The Bodley Head books
Margaret K. McElderry books